Spurgeon House is a historic home near High Point, Davidson County, North Carolina. It was built about 1854 and is a two-story frame dwelling with Late Federal and Greek Revival design elements. It has an irregular configuration with a -story wing and two-story addition. Also on the property are contributing outbuildings including a kitchen, slave house, spring house, smokehouse, chickenhouse, two frame barns, a frame carriage house, and a log root cellar.

It was added to the National Register of Historic Places in 1983.

References

Houses on the National Register of Historic Places in North Carolina
Federal architecture in North Carolina
Greek Revival houses in North Carolina
Houses completed in 1845
Houses in Davidson County, North Carolina
National Register of Historic Places in Davidson County, North Carolina